1996 Czech Lion Awards ceremony was held on 1 March 1997.

Winners and nominees

Non-statutory Awards

References

1996 film awards
Czech Lion Awards ceremonies